Naghan District is in Kiar County, Chaharmahal and Bakhtiari province, Iran. At the 2006 census, its population was 15,372 in 3,534 households, when it was a district in Ardal County. The following census in 2011 counted 15,507 people in 3,955 households, by which time the district was in the newly established Kiar County. At the latest census in 2016, the district had 15,957 inhabitants living in 4,695 households.

References 

Kiar County

Districts of Chaharmahal and Bakhtiari Province

Populated places in Chaharmahal and Bakhtiari Province

Populated places in Kiar County